The Japanese destroyer {{nihongo|Nashi|梨|}} was one of 21 s built for the Imperial Japanese Navy (IJN) in the late 1910s. She was decommissioned in 1940 and subsequently scrapped.

Design and description
The Momi class was designed with higher speed and better seakeeping than the preceding  second-class destroyers. Nashi was powered by two Brown-Curtis geared steam turbines, each driving one propeller shaft using steam provided by three Kampon water-tube boilers. Their crew consisted of 110 officers and crewmen.

The main armament of the Momi-class ships consisted of three  Type 3 guns in single mounts; one gun forward of the well deck, one between the two funnels, and the last gun atop the aft superstructure. The guns were numbered '1' to '3' from front to rear. The ships carried two above-water twin sets of  torpedo tubes; one mount was in the well deck between the forward superstructure and the bow gun and the other between the aft funnel and aft superstructure.

Construction and career
Nashi, built at the Kawasaki Shipyards in Kobe, Japan, was launched on the 26th of August 1919 and completed on December 10th, 1919. She was stricken from the Navy List on February 1, 1940 and subsequently broken up for scrap at an unknown date.

Notes

References

1919 ships
Ships built by Kawasaki Heavy Industries
Momi-class destroyers